Falah Mustafa Bakir (born 1964) is a Kurdish politician from Kurdistan Region, Iraq serving as Senior Foreign Policy Advisor to President Nechirvan Barzani with a ministerial rank. 

He was appointed to this position in August 2019, after having served as (Minister) the first Head of the Kurdistan Regional Government (KRG) Department of Foreign Relations (DFR) from 2006 to 2019.

Early life and education

Falah Mustafa Bakir was born in Erbil in 1964. He obtained his undergraduate degree at the University of Mosul, his graduate degree in Development Studies at the University of Bath, and a senior manager's executive program certificate at Harvard University’s Kennedy School of Government. He is fluent in Kurdish, Arabic, and English.

Foreign Minister of the KRG

In 2006, he created the Kurdistan Department of Foreign Relations, and he has served as its Foreign Minister since then after taking the role in September 2006.

In September 2016, he remained Kurdistan Regional Government's minister of foreign relations. That month he asserted that "if we reach an agreement with Baghdad (on statehood), there may not be a need for a referendum."

In October 2016, he stated publicly that the Peshmerga were suffering casualties due to a lack of air support.

He is a frequent guest lecturer at Salahaddin University in Erbil.

Personal life
He is married and lives with his wife and four children in Erbil.

See also

List of current foreign ministers
List of foreign ministers in 2017
List of foreign ministers in 2006
Foreign relations of Iraqi Kurdistan

References

External links

Government Profile 

 

Living people
1964 births
People from Erbil
University of Mosul alumni
Alumni of the University of Bath
Harvard Kennedy School alumni
Iraqi expatriates in the United States